
Gmina Ińsko is an urban-rural gmina (administrative district) in Stargard County, West Pomeranian Voivodeship, in north-western Poland.

The gmina contains part of the protected area called Ińsko Landscape Park.

Villages
Apart from the town of Ińsko, Gmina Ińsko contains the villages and settlements of Ciemnik, Czertyń, Dolnik, Granica, Gronówko, Kanice, Kleszcze, Linówko, Miałka, Nierybno, Powalice, Ścienne, Storkowo, Studnica, Waliszewo and Wierzchucice.

Neighbouring gminas
Gmina Ińsko is bordered by the gminas of Chociwel, Dobrzany, Drawsko Pomorskie, Kalisz Pomorski, Recz and Węgorzyno.

References
Polish official population figures 2006

Insko
Stargard County